Platinum Christmas is a 2000 holiday album released by Jive Records on November 14, 2000. "My Gift to You" by Donell Jones appears only in the North American release, in the rest of the world Jones's song has been replaced by "Perfect Christmas" by S Club 7.

It was followed with two further compilations, Platinum Christmas II in 2004, and Platinum Christmas III in 2006, both were released in Canada only.

Singles
"My Only Wish (This Year)", by Britney Spears, was released as promotional single on November 14, 2000. The song appeared in the Danish Singles Chart on December 26, 2008 and peaking at number 14 in 2017. It charted in Slovakia, on December 28, 2009, at number 54. It made its first appearance on Billboard Holiday/Seasonal Digital Songs on November 27, 2010, peaking at number 49 as a result of digital downloads. On December 3, 2010, Nielsen SoundScan reported that there had so far been 162,000 paid digital downloads of the song in the United States.

"Perfect Christmas" by S Club 7 was released as promotional single in United Kingdom on November 15, 2000.

Track listing

North America
This version, with "My Gift to You" by Donell Jones, was released only in United States and Canada.

off-North America
This version, with "Perfect Christmas" by S Club 7, was released in Europe, South America, Asia and Oceania.

Charts

Weekly charts

Year-end charts

Certifications

References

2000 compilation albums
2000 Christmas albums
Christmas compilation albums
Pop Christmas albums
Jive Records compilation albums
Pop compilation albums